Cycling in Australia is a common form of transport, recreation and sport.

Many Australians enjoy cycling because it improves their health and reduces road congestion and air pollution. The government has encouraged more people to start, with several state advertising campaigns aimed at increasing safety for those who choose to ride. There is a common perception that riding is a dangerous activity. While it is safer to walk, cycling is a safer method of transport than driving. Cycling is less popular in Australia than in Europe, however cyclists make up one in forty road deaths and one in seven serious injuries.

In 2020, 1.7 million bicycle were sold

History 

Bicycles arrived in Australia in 1860s, and the sport was quickly adopted with touring and racing clubs forming.

By the 1890s cycling was accessible to the middle class, and long distance cycle travelling was a fact of life for many sheep shearers and other agricultural labourers with migratory work. The bicycle and swag travelled much of Australia on dusty dirt tracks, long before the automobile made its appearance. In the main, however, long distance cycling was a sport of endurance or was done out of necessity.

At the same time, racing became quite popular with the Austral Wheel Race beginning in 1887, and leading to the development of the Malvern Star cycling brand. The first Melbourne to Warrnambool Classic, a long distance event, was held in October 1895, eight years before the first Tour de France.

Between 1990 and 1992 Australia become the first country to make wearing helmets compulsory, after a number of studies indicated that they reduced head injuries. After their introduction, the overall number of riders decreased, mostly due to a decline in children riding to school. This has not conclusively shown to be due to mandatory helmet laws and may have followed pre-existing trends dating from the 1970s.

Laws 
Cyclists in every state are required to follow normal road rules, including using traffic lights correctly and observing give way and stop signs while riding on the road.

Cyclists in every state must wear helmets while in motion. In all states, cyclists must ride as close as practicable to the left side of the road when on a single lane road, however, cyclists may use any lane and does not have to keep to the left on a multi-lane road.  All states require only one passenger per bicycle unless the bicycle is designed otherwise.

Bike users in Western Australia and Tasmania must use both hand signals, while in Victoria, Queensland, New South Wales, and Northern Territory cyclists must signal when turning right but it's not compulsory when turning left.

Cyclist must have at least one hand on handle bars in Western Australia, Northern Territory and Queensland.

Cyclist may ride on standard footpaths in Western Australia, Northern Territory, South Australia and Australian Capital Territory. In Victoria cyclists can only ride on a footpath if they're under the age of 13 or supervising a child under 13, or have a disability which restrains them from being able to ride on the road. In New South Wales cyclists can only ride on a footpath if they're under the age of 16 or supervising a child under 16. In Queensland cyclists can ride on any path as long as there isn't a sign stating otherwise.

Cyclists may ride in groups or bunches in all Australia States and territories, riding two abreast riders must be no more than 1.5 meters apart.

Cyclists across Australia must follow the same rules as motor vehicle drivers in regards to using mobile phones and consuming alcohol.

Cyclist also need to use a bike light when riding at night in Western Australia, Tasmania, Northern Territory, South Australia and Queensland.

Types of cycling

Recreational cycling

Many Australians ride a bike for recreation or commuting.

In 2017 1.4% of commuters cycled to work of which 75% were male. Most are concentrated in the flatter parts of major cities, close to the CBD.

In 2017 15.5% of Australians ride a bike at least weekly, declining from 18.2% in 2011.

The National Cycling Strategy was tasked with doubling the number of people cycling from 2011 to 2016, which was not achieved. Demographic changes, and decreasing numbers of riders within capital cities accounted for most of the decrease. Some of the decrease within NSW has been blamed on increased cycling fines implemented in 2016.

The NCS has found that cycling was the most common in Western Australia, the Northern Territory and Australian Capital Territory during 2015. Victoria and Queensland have decreased in participation between 2011 and 2015.

Doubling the number of bike users has the potential to increase the safety for all riders by helping to make drivers more aware of bicycles on the road, and adding pressure to those who already cycle to obey the road rules. More bike users also has an economic benefit which is estimated in Australia to be $1.43 per kilometre for every person cycled.

There are a number of trails and shared paths in the major cities.

Cycling as a sport

Australia hosts the Tour Down Under which is the only UCI World Tour event in the southern hemisphere. Australians place strongly in cycling at the Olympic Games, UCI World Championships and other international events.

Australia has hosted the UCI Road World Championships, UCI Track Cycling World Championships and UCI Mountain Bike & Trials World Championships. Most state capitals have an indoor velodrome.

Safety

Fatality data 
In Australia, police report road fatalities to the State and Territory road safety authorities. The Bureau of Infrastructure, Transport and Regional Economics (BITRE) then catalogues this data in the Australian Road Deaths Database (ARDD).

List of bicycle fatalities in Australia

2023

Footscray and Dock Link Road, Melbourne, 2 February 2023 

{
  "type": "FeatureCollection",
  "features": [
    {
      "type": "Feature",
      "geometry": {
        "type": "Point",
        "coordinates": [144.916216,-37.807780]
      }
    }
    ]
}On 2 February 2023, Angus Collins (22 year old) was killed by a truck driver while cycling his bike. The incident occurred around 12:30pm at the corner of Footscray Road and Dock Link Road in Melbourne. The bike lane crosses an intersection where the bike lane is partially obscured by a 3 metre wide pillar.

Contributing factors 
The bicycle advocacy organisation BikeWest said that it was “likely” the cyclist and the truck driver had simultaneous green lights. The Age newspaper reported that regular users of the road said the green lights are always simultaneous.

The transport planning document VicRoads Guidance on Treating Pedestrian and Turning Vehicle Conflicts at Signalised Intersections already states that a "Fully Controlled" left turn is "appropriate" for a bicycle priority route. It states potential locations are "at intersections with a high number of turning heavy vehicles." A possible reason it wasn't implemented is the listed "consideration": "Where the left turn is fully controlled, the potential negative perception from drivers while waiting to turn at times when there are no pedestrians crossing."

BikeWest president John Symons commented that it was disappointing lessons had not been learned from the "shockingly similar" fatality of Arzu Karakoc who was killed in 2017 by a truck turning left across her path.

Aftermath 
The  Amy Gillet Foundation, a cycling advocacy and safety group, called for safer road infrastructure so that mistakes by drivers do no cause a pedestrian or cyclist to be killed.

Cycling organisations

National bodies

National sporting organisation
 AusCyclingthe national sporting organisation recognised by the Australian Sports Commission, responsible for the administration of and promotion of the sport of cycling in Australia

Other national bodies

 Audax Australiaan organisation that promotes long distance road cycling
 Bicycle NetworkAustralia's largest cycling membership organisations (45,000 members, 2015) with offices in Victoria and Tasmania.
 Cycling Promotion Fund

State bodies
 Bicycle NSW
 Bicycle Queensland
 Bike SA
 West Cycle

Foundations
 Amy Gillett Foundation - a charity to promote safe cycling in Australia

Magazines
 Cyclist Australia/NZ Magazine - the thrill of the ride 
Treadlie Magazine - a magazine for bike lovers
 Bicycling Australia Magazine - a cycling magazine

Websites
 CycleLifeHQ - a website for finding the best bike rides in Australia

Awards
The Australian Bicycling Achievement Awards, an initiative of the Cycling Promotion Fund, have been held annually since 2002.

See also
 Bicycle helmets in Australia
 Ciombola, a bike frame company active between 1998 and 2005
 Cycling in New South Wales
 Cycling in Canberra
 Cycling in Sydney
 Cycling in Victoria
 Mountain biking in Australia

References

References and further reading